This list details major Super Smash Bros. Melee tournaments from 2007 to the present.

Major tournaments

References 

Melee